Cebu Doctors' University, also referred to by its acronym CDU and colloquially Cebu Doc, is a private nonsectarian coeducational higher education institution located in Mandaue City, Cebu, Philippines. It was founded in 1973 at Cebu City as Cebu Doctors' College (CDC), the school was formally renamed in 2005 as Cebu Doctors' University (CDU). It is organized into eight colleges, a Graduate school, and as of 2016, a Senior High school (Grades 11 and 12).

Cebu Doctors' University consistently ranks among the top medical universities in the Philippines based on the National Licensure Examinations.

It is the only private institution in the Philippines granted a University Status without having a basic education curriculum and catering mainly to courses related to the health services field. It is the first non-sectarian university in the Visayas to be granted the Autonomous Status, the highest status a university can get from the Commission on Higher Education (CHED).

Brief history 
Cebu Doctors' University was organized in 1973 as Cebu Doctors' College and was registered with the Securities and Exchange Commission in 1976. Its first campus was located adjacent to the present Cebu Doctors' University Hospital. Cebu Doctors' College of Nursing (CDU-CN) was the first College of the university when it was opened in 1973. Subsequently, the following colleges opened: in 1975, the Cebu Doctors' College of Arts and Sciences (CDU-CAS); in 1977, the Cebu Doctors' College of Medicine (CDU-CM), a non-stock, non-profit medical foundation; in 1980, the Cebu Doctors' College of Dentistry (CDU-CD), the Cebu Doctors' College of Optometry (CDU-CO), and the Graduate School; and in 1982, the Cebu Doctors' Institute of Allied Medical Sciences (CDIAMS) which was later renamed Cebu Doctors' College of Allied Medical Sciences (CDU-CAMS). In 1992, it was reconstructed creating therefrom a separate college, the Cebu Doctors' College of Rehabilitative Sciences (CDU-CRS). In 2004, the Cebu Doctors' University College of Pharmacy (CDU-CP) was established. And in 2016, the Cebu Doctors' University Senior High School (CDU-SHS) was set up under the CDU-CAS.

Colleges

College of Nursing

Degree programs 
 B.Sc. in Nursing

Highlights 
 Level III status granted by PAASCU
 One of the top performing nursing schools in the Philippines based on Licensure Exam results.

College of Arts and Sciences

Degree programs 
 B.Sc. in Biology
 B.Sc. in Computer Science
 B.Sc. in Nutrition and Dietetics
 B.Sc. in Food Technology
 AB English major in ESL/EFL
 AB Psychology
 AB International Studies major in Asian, American and European Studies
 Associate in Computer Technology
 Associate in Health science education

Highlights 
 Its Biology program is granted Level II status by PAASCU

College of Medicine

Degree programs 
 Doctor of Medicine

Highlights 
 PBL system; associated with Cebu Doctors' University Hospital
 Ranked number 8 during the September 2016 PRC Results
 The CDU-CM developed the teaching modules to be used in medical schools throughout the country for the integration of domestic and family violence issues into the medical curriculum.
 Its Kauswagan Community Outreach Program has won one silver and two gold HAMIS awards for excellence in health services delivery awarded by the Department of Health.

College of Dentistry

Degree programs 
 Pre-Dentistry
 Doctor of Dental Medicine

Highlights 
 Ranks first among all dental schools in the Visayas and Mindanao with consistent board topnotchers in the National Dentists Licensure Examination.

College of Optometry

Degree programs 
 Pre-Optometry
 Doctor of Optometry

Highlights 
 The premier Optometry school in the Philippines
 Consistently tops the National Optometrist Licensure Examination and consistently produces board topnotchers
 Level II status granted by PACUCOA

College of Allied Medical Sciences

Degree programs 
 B.Sc. in Medical Laboratory Science (Medical Technology)
 B.Sc. in Radiologic Technology

Highlights 
 Level II status granted by PAASCU
 Consistent 100 percent passing rate in the National Licensure Examination for its Medical Laboratory Science Program which also produces consistent board topnotchers
 The First of the two schools who offers Radiologic Technology program in the province of Cebu.

College of Rehabilitative Sciences

Degree programs 
 B.Sc. in Physical Therapy
 B.Sc. in Occupational Therapy
 B.Sc. in Respiratory Therapy
 B.Sc. in Speech Language Pathology

Highlights 
 The premier PT and OT school in the South, and the first institution to offer the PT and OT programs in the Visayas and Mindanao
 First PT and OT school in the Visayas to establish International linkage in the U.S. and Hong Kong
 One of the five schools in the Philippines accredited by the World Federation of Occupational Therapists (WFOT), and the first in the Visayas and Mindanao to receive OT program accreditation by the Occupational Therapy Association of the Philippines (OTAP)
 Consistent high ranking and Board topnotchers in the National Licensure Examinations for PT, OT, and RTp, with passing percentages above the national mark

College of Pharmacy

Degree programs 
 B.Sc. in Pharmacy

Graduate school

Programs offered 

 Doctor of Philosophy in Nursing Science (PhDNS) Program A
 Medical-Surgical Nursing (MSN)
 Maternal-Child Nursing (MCN)
 Psychiatric Nursing (PsychN)
 Geriatric Nursing (GN)
 Family Health Nursing
 Nursing Administration Program B
 Combined Program A in MSN, MCN, PsychN, GN, FHN
 Master of Science in Dentistry (MSD) Major in:
 Endodontics
 Dental Surgery
 Orthodontics
 Periodontics with Implant Dentistry
 Master of Science in Medical Technology (MSMT)
 Master of Science in Pharmacy (MSPh)
 Master of Science in Physical Therapy
 Doctor of Philosophy in Organization Development (PHDOD)
 Doctor of Philosophy in Organization Development in School Administration (PHDODSA)
 Master of Arts in Organization Development (MAOD)
 Master of Science in Nursing (MSN) Major in:
 Medical-Surgical Nursing (MSN)
 Maternal-Child Nursing (MCN)
 Psychiatric Nursing (PsychN)
 Geriatric Nursing (GN)
 Family Health Nursing
 Nursing Administration
 Master of Arts Major in:
 Hospital Administration
 Teaching Medical Related Subjects
 Educational Management
 Master of Arts in Occupational Therapy (MAOT)
 Master of Arts in Psychology (MAPsyc) Major in: 
 Clinical Psychology
 Industrial Psychology
 Social Psychology

Senior High School

Tracks and Strands offerings 

Academic Track
 S T E M Science, Technology, Engineering, Math
 HUMSS Humanities and Social Sciences

Admissions 
Students are admitted on the basis of their individual qualifications, regardless of sex, religion or race. CDU, especially the college offering a certain course offering, requires evidence of general competence, motivation, and capability. Aside from grades and test scores, preference shall be given to those who are properly motivated evincing an interest to learn, and have consistently demonstrated a genuine concern to follow CDU's standards.

Campus facilities

Library 
The Cebu Doctors' University has two libraries, namely: the Main Library, which is located on the second floor and the University Medical Library, which is found on the fifth floor of Cebu Doctors' University. The University Library caters to the needs of all students of Cebu Doctors' University, except those of the College of Medicine, the latter having its own library.

CDU Swimming Pool

University Examination Hall 
Old Gymnasium now being utilized as an Examination Hall

References

External links 
 

Dental schools in the Philippines
Education in Mandaue
Nursing schools in the Philippines
Medical schools in the Philippines
Universities and colleges in Metro Cebu
Educational institutions established in 1975
1975 establishments in the Philippines